Bringelly is a suburb of Sydney, in the state of New South Wales, Australia. It is located on the Northern Road between Penrith and Camden. It has a public school. Bringelly is also the name of a local hill.

History
Bringelly was a name given to a district of Sydney in the early 19th century and later a parish of the County of Cumberland. The Parish of Bringelly also included the neighbouring suburbs of Greendale, Wallacia and Badgerys Creek. Robert Lowe was granted  in the parish of Bringelly in 1812 and is believed to be the first British settler in the area.

By 1818, most of the land had been granted and was being cleared for farms. The principal surgeon of New South Wales, D'Arcy Wentworth, received a grant in the area. Legend has it that The Wild Colonial Boy Bold Jack Donahue also used the suburb as a hideout and was eventually killed on Wentworth's property.

Another property of note is Kelvin, also known as The Retreat, which was built in 1820 by Thomas Laycock Jnr. A Georgian farmhouse, Kelvin is surrounded by a garden and is listed on the New South Wales State Heritage Register and the (now defunct) Register of the National Estate.

Luddenham Post Office opened on 1 January 1857 and was renamed Bringelly in December 1863. Bringelly Public School opened in 1878. Local government came to the area in 1906 with the creation of the Shire of Nepean, covering the area from Hoxton Park west to the Nepean River and south as far as Narellan. The Shire never thrived and when the New South Wales Government amalgamated a number of local councils in 1948, it was divided amongst Penrith, Liverpool, Campbelltown and Camden. In the process, the suburb of Bringelly was split between Liverpool and Camden Councils and remains so to this day.

Aerotropolis 
Bringelly is adjacent to Badgerys Creek, site of the future Western Sydney Airport. The NSW Government plans to build a new commercial centre in Bringelly's north, which is intended to emerge as the city's third commercial centre behind Sydney and Parramatta. In March 2021, Premier Gladys Berejiklian announced that the new centre would be in honour of Sydney Harbour Bridge engineer Dr John Bradfield. The name was chosen by a committee following a call for public submissions in 2020. Berejiklian said that "The name Bradfield is synonymous with delivering game-changing infrastructure".

Bradfield was also the name of a suburb in Sydney's North Shore district between 1924 and 1977.

Population
In the 2016 Census, there were 2,507 people in Bringelly. 73.0% of people were born in Australia. 68.8% of people spoke only English at home. Other languages spoken at home included Italian 4.9% and Arabic 4.7%. The most common responses for religion were Catholic 46.9%, Anglican 13.4% and No Religion 11.4%.

Heritage listings
Bringelly has a number of heritage-listed sites, including:
 30 The Retreat: Kelvin

Notable residents
 Bold Jack Donahue (1806–1830), Australian bushranger
 Thomas Laycock (1786 –1823), English soldier, explorer, and later businessman
 D'Arcy Wentworth (1762–1827), NSW Surgeon-general

Transport
Bringelly has reasonably easy road access to Penrith and Camden via The Northern Road and to Liverpool via Bringelly Road. The only public transport in the area consists of bus routes 855 and 856 operated by Interline Bus Services, connecting Bringelly to Liverpool via Rossmore, Austral, Hoxton Park and Cartwright.

References

Suburbs of Sydney
Populated places established in 1812
1812 establishments in Australia
City of Liverpool (New South Wales)